was a Japanese domain of the Edo period.  It is associated with Hizen Province in modern-day Saga Prefecture.

In the han system, Karatsu was a political and economic abstraction based on periodic cadastral surveys and projected agricultural yields.  In other words, the domain was defined in terms of kokudaka, not land area. This was different from the feudalism of the West.

History
Karatsu domain was founded in 1593, by Terazawa Hirotaka, who was granted lordship of Karatsu and landholdings of 83,000 koku. He was also Nagasaki bugyō under the Tokugawa bakufu. The Terazawa clan took part in the Battle of Sekigahara on the side of Tokugawa Ieyasu and received an additional 40,000 koku of land, bringing the total revenues of the domain up to 123,000 koku. The Terazawa took part in the Shogunate's expedition to suppress the Shimabara Uprising. The family held on to Karatsu until 1647, when Hirotaka's son Katataka committed suicide; due to a lack of heir, the family came to an end and the domain was confiscated by the central government.

Several families were rotated through Karatsu for the next century: two generations of the Ōkubo clan; three generations of the Ogyū-Matsudaira clan, four generations of the Doi clan, and four of the Mizuno clan, including the famous reformer Mizuno Tadakuni. The domain then passed into the hands of Ogasawara Nagamasa, whose family remained until Karatsu domain was abolished in 1871. During the Boshin War of the Meiji Restoration of 1868-69, Ogasawara Nagamichi, the de facto ruler of Karatsu, led a group of his retainers on the side of the Ōuetsu Reppan Dōmei; after the fall of this alliance he went to Ezo and fought under the forces of the Ezo Republic. At the same time, Karatsu's domain-based administration was forced to pledge military support to the Satchō Alliance of Emperor Meiji.

Ogasawara Naganari, the Meiji period Imperial Japanese Navy admiral, was a descendant of the Ogasawara branch which ruled Karatsu.

List of daimyōs 
The hereditary daimyōs were head of the clan and head of the domain.

 Terazawa clan, 1593–1647 (tozama; 83,000 → 123,000 koku)
{| class=wikitable
!  || Name || Tenure || Courtesy title || Court Rank || Revenue
|-
|1||||1593-1633||Shima-no-kami|| Lower 4th (従四位下) ||83,000 → 123,000 koku
|-
|2|||| 1633-1647||Hyogoto (兵庫頭) || Lower 5th (従五位下) ||123,000 koku
|}

 Ōkubo clan 1649–1678 (fudai; 90,000 koku)
{| class=wikitable
!  || Name || Tenure || Courtesy title || Court Rank || Revenue
|-
|1|||| 1649–1670||Kaga-no-kami|| Lower 4th (従四位下) ||83,000 koku

|-
|2|||| 1670–1678|| Kaga-no-kami ||Lower 5th (従五位下) ||83,000 koku

|}

 Matsudaira (Ogyū) clan 1678–1691 (fudai; 70,000 → 60,000 koku)
{| class=wikitable
!  || Name || Tenure|| Courtesy title || Court Rank || Revenue
|-
|1|||| 1678–1686||Izumi-no-kami|| Lower 4th (従四位下) ||70,000 koku
|-
|2|||| 1686–1690||Izumi-no-kami ||Lower 5th (従五位下) ||70,000 koku
|-
|3|||| 1690–1691||Izumi-no-kami|| Lower 4th (従四位下) ||60,000 koku
|}

 Doi clan 1691–1762 (fudai; 70,000 koku)
{| class=wikitable
!  || Name || Tenure|| Courtesy title || Court Rank || Revenue
|-
|1|||| 1691–1713||Suo-no-kami ||Lower 5th (従五位下) ||70,000 koku
|-
|2|||| 1713–1736||Oito (大炊頭) ||Lower 5th (従五位下) ||70,000 koku
|-
|3|||| 1736–1744||Oito (大炊頭) ||Lower 5th (従五位下) ||70,000 koku
|-
|4|||| 1744–1762||Oito (大炊頭) || Lower 4th (従四位下)||70,000 koku
|}

  Mizuno clan 1762–1817 (fudai; 60,000 koku)
{| class=wikitable
!  || Name || Tenure|| Courtesy title || Court Rank || Revenue
|-
|1|||| 1762–1775||Izumi-no-kami ||Lower 5th (従五位下) ||60,000 koku
|-
|2|||| 1775–1805||Ukonoefu (左近将監)||Lower 5th (従五位下) ||60,000 koku
|-
|3|||| 1805–1812||Izumi-no-kami ||Lower 5th (従五位下) ||60,000 koku
|-
|4|||| 1812–1817||Echizen-no-kami, Rōjū ||Lower 5th (従五位下) ||60,000 koku
|}

  Ogasawara clan 1817–1871 (Fudai; 60,000 koku)
{| class=wikitable
!  || Name || Tenure|| Courtesy title || Court Rank || Revenue
|-
|1|||| 1817–1823||Tomoro-no-tsukasa(主殿頭)||Lower 5th (従五位下) ||60,000 koku 
|-
|2|||| 1823–1833||Iki-no-kami||Lower 5th (従五位下) ||60,000 koku 
|-
|3|||| 1833–1836||Noto-no-kami||Lower 5th (従五位下) ||60,000 koku
|-
|4|||| 1836–1840||Sado-no-kami||Lower 5th (従五位下) ||60,000 koku
|-
|5|||| 1840–1871||Nakatsukasa daiyū (中務大輔)||Lower 5th (従五位下) ||60,000 koku
|}

See also 
 List of Han
 Abolition of the han system

References

Further reading
 Bolitho, Harold. (1974). Treasures Among Men: The Fudai Daimyo in Tokugawa Japan. New Haven: Yale University Press.  ;  OCLC 185685588
 Rein, Johannes (1884). Japan: Travels and Researches Undertaken at the Cost of the Prussian Government. New York: A.C. Armstrong & Son.

External links
  "Karatsu" at Edo 300 

Domains of Japan
1871 disestablishments in Japan
States and territories established in 1593
States and territories disestablished in 1871
Mizuno clan
Ogasawara clan
Ogyū-Matsudaira clan
Ōkubo clan